Robbie Booth (born 30 December 1985) is an English footballer.

Career
Booth was signed by Chester as a youngster from Everton, where he was released in March 2004 along with fellow Chester-bound player Gavin Lynch. He made his first-team debut for Chester in a 2–1 Football League Trophy win at Sheffield Wednesday on 29 September 2004, with his first league appearance being made two months later at home to Oxford United. He netted his first goal against Boston United the following April but he was released along with the majority of the remainder of the squad by new manager Keith Curle at the end of the season.

This remains the last time Booth was contracted to a Football League club, as he joined Southport.

After more than a year playing in the Conference National, Booth joined Burscough in September 2006, following manager Liam Watson, to the Sandgrounders' neighbours. 
However, with Watson returning to Southport in 2008, Booth did not take long to follow, with confirmation of him re-joining the Conference North side, on 19 July. However, as part of the deal to bring Tony Gray back to Southport, Booth along with Bradley Barnes and Ciaran Kilheeney signed for Droylsden.

In September 2010, Booth signed for the recently reformed Chester. He became the second player after Carl Ruffer to make first team appearances for both Chester City and Chester. After being injured, in November 2012 he joined Vauxhall Motors on loan to regain match fitness. His club debut came on 3 November in a 2–0 home defeat to Brackley Town.

On 26 April 2014 he won promotion to the Conference Premier with Telford after they clinched the Conference North title on the final game of the season.

References

External links
Burscough FC profile

1985 births
Living people
Footballers from Liverpool
English footballers
Association football midfielders
Association football forwards
Everton F.C. players
Chester City F.C. players
Southport F.C. players
Burscough F.C. players
Droylsden F.C. players
Chester F.C. players
Vauxhall Motors F.C. players
Bangor City F.C. players
AFC Telford United players
Warrington Town F.C. players
Colwyn Bay F.C. players
Skelmersdale United F.C. players
English Football League players
National League (English football) players